An election for President of Israel was held in the Knesset on 28 October 1957 following the end of Yitzhak Ben-Zvi's five-year term in office. Ben-Zvi stood again, and it was suggested that Yosef Yoel Rivlin (father of future president Reuven Rivlin) would run against him as a representative of Herut. However, in the end Rivlin did not participate in the election.

Although Ben-Zvi was the only candidate, a vote was still held. He was re-elected with 76 of the 94 ballots cast; the other 18 votes were blank ballots. 26 Knesset members did not vote.

Ben-Zvi's second term began on the day of the election.

Results

References

External links
Previous Presidential Elections Knesset website 

President
Presidential elections in Israel
Single-candidate elections
Israel